Kalateh-ye Mir Hasan (also Romanized as Kalāteh-ye Mīr Ḩasan; also known as Mīr Ḩasan and Patū) is a village in Balaband Rural District, in the Central District of Fariman County, Razavi Khorasan Province, Iran. At the 2006 census, its population was 89, in 22 families.

References 

Populated places in Fariman County